Terøya may refer to the following places in Norway:

Terøya, Haram, an island in Haram Municipality, Møre og Romsdal county
Terøya, Hordaland, an islet in Kvinnherad Municipality, Hordaland county
Lille Terøya, an islet in Øksnes Municipality, Nordland county
Store Terøya, an islet in Øksnes Municipality, Nordland county